Grevillea dryophylla, also known as Goldfields grevillea, is a species of flowering plant in the family Proteaceae and is endemic to Victoria, Australia. It is a spreading to erect shrub with hairy branchlets, lobed leaves, and green to brown or yellow flowers.

Description
The tips of the teeth or lobes are usually sharply pointed, the edges are turned down and the lower surface in covered with wavy to curly hairs.

Taxonomy
Grevillea dryophylla was first formally described in 1957 by Norman Wakefield in The Victorian Naturalist from specimens collected near Bendigo in 1934 by Alfred James Tadgell.

Distribution and habitat
Goldfields grevillea occurs in dry sclerophyll forest in an area bounded by St Arnaud, Bendigo, Castlemaine and  Maryborough.

Conservation status
The species is listed as "rare in Victoria" on the Department of Environment and Primary Industries Advisory List of Rare or Threatened Plants in Victoria.

References

dryophylla
Flora of Victoria (Australia)
Proteales of Australia
Plants described in 1957
Taxa named by Norman Arthur Wakefield